Kallet is a surname. Notable people with the surname include:

 Arthur Kallet (1902–1972), American consumer advocate
 Cindy Kallet, American folk singer